Pensacola International Airport , formerly Pensacola Gulf Coast Regional Airport and Pensacola Regional Airport (Hagler Field), is a public use airport  northeast of the central business district of Pensacola, in Escambia County, Florida, United States. It is owned by the City of Pensacola. Despite its name, the airport does not offer scheduled international flights, though chartered international flights are not uncommon. This airport is one of the five major airports in North Florida, and among these is the second largest by passenger count, only behind Jacksonville. The other airports in the North Florida region are: Northwest Florida Beaches International Airport, Destin-Fort Walton Beach Airport, Tallahassee International Airport, and Jacksonville International Airport.

It is included in the Federal Aviation Administration (FAA) National Plan of Integrated Airport Systems for 2021–2025, in which it is categorized as a small-hub primary commercial service facility. As per Federal Aviation Administration records, the airport had 771,917 passenger boardings (enplanements) in calendar year 2008, 694,786 enplanements in 2009, and 729,748 in 2010. In 2018, the airport served 1.9 million passengers.

History
In 1935, a passenger terminal opened, and airline service began two years later. Atlantic and Gulf Airlines went out of business a few months later after failing to get an airmail contract.  In 1938 National Airlines began flights to Mobile and Jacksonville. From 1940 to 1945, the airport was a U.S. Navy training facility; the Navy built a control tower and added a fourth runway. In 1947 Eastern Air Lines began service out of Pensacola, and in 1952 a modern terminal replaced the original one. The airport was then dedicated to L.C. Hagler, the former mayor of Pensacola. In 1968 Eastern began the first scheduled jet service from Pensacola.

In 1978, after deregulation of the airline industry, several airlines began serving Pensacola, including Continental and Delta. In 1978 a National Airlines Boeing 727 crashed into Escambia Bay while on approach for landing, the first fatal airline accident in the area. In 1979 US Airways, then called USAir, arrived at Pensacola. In 1990 the current terminal was built and AirTran Airways began jet service in 2001. In 2005 United Express began service out of Pensacola. After stopping service to Pensacola in the 1990s, American Airlines (operating as American Eagle) began service again in Pensacola in 2004. Southwest Airlines initiated service to Pensacola in 2013 after purchasing Airtran Airways. Frontier Airlines initiated service at Pensacola in 2018.

Pensacola mayor Ashton Hayward announced on November 9, 2011, that the airport would change its name from Pensacola Gulf Coast Regional Airport to Pensacola International Airport, effective immediately.

Facilities and aircraft
Pensacola International Airport covers an area of 1,211 acres (490 ha) at an elevation of 121 feet (37 m) above mean sea level. It has two runways: 17/35 is 7,004 by 150 feet (2,135 x 46 m) with a concrete surface; 08/26 is 7,000 by 150 feet (2,134 x 46 m) with an asphalt surface.

Runway 17 has an instrument landing system and approach lights, while the Runway 26 approach has a localizer approach. A 1,000 ft. extension to the east end of Runway 08/26 was completed in 2006. The airport hopes to extend Runway 17/35 to about 8,500 ft.

The airport's two war-era diagonal runways were decommissioned in the 1960s.

For the 12-month period ending February 28, 2021, the airport had 94,079 aircraft operations, an average of 258 per day: 54% general aviation, 21% military, 18% commercial and 8% air taxi. In November 2021, there were 152 aircraft based at this airport: 109 single-engine, 16 multi-engine and 27 jet.

Terminal
Pensacola has one passenger terminal with 12 gates, built in the early 1990s. Gates 1 through 10 are located on the 2nd floor, while Gates 11 and 12 are located on the ground floor. 
 
Gate assignments:
 American: 5, 6, 7, 8, 9
 Delta: 2, 4
 Silver: 11
 Southwest: 10
 United: 1, 3
 Frontier: 6
 Boutique Air: 12
 Spirit: 8

Terminal expansion
The terminal was expanded in 2011 at a cost of $35 million.  The expansion was designed by Gresham, Smith, and Partners and Stoa Architects.

In 2022, it was announced that the city of Pensacola was looking into a $70 million concourse and parking expansion that would provide more space to handle the airport's rapid increase in passenger numbers and flights.

Management
The airport is operated as a self-funding department of the government of the City of Pensacola.

Airlines and destinations

Passenger

Cargo operations
UPS Airlines is the only major cargo carrier at the airport currently. UPS flies two flights into Pensacola, four days out of the week, Tuesday through Friday. On Saturday, UPS only flies one flight to Pensacola. Suburban Air Freight operates daily flights to Atlanta with a Beech 1900C. Ameriflight operated daily feeder flights for UPS to Mobile Downtown Airport and Gulfport–Biloxi International Airport with the Swearingen Fairchild SA227-AT Metro until July 16, 2016. As of July 18, 2016, Martinaire took over feeder service from Ameriflight with the Cessna 208B Super Cargomaster.

Statistics

Passenger traffic

Top destinations

Airline market share

Accidents and incidents
On May 8, 1978 National Airlines Flight 193 landed in Escambia Bay while approaching the east–west runway. Three of the 58 passengers and crew on board were killed.
On January 2, 1982, a United States Navy Beechcraft Super King Air crashed into a housing development on approach north of Pensacola Regional Airport. The plane struck several trees, fell on a car and collided with an oak tree. The pilot was killed, the other seven occupants survived.
On December 27, 1987, Eastern Air Lines Flight 573, a McDonnell-Douglas DC-9-31 suffered a hard landing, causing the aircraft to bounce and break apart aft of the wings. All four crew and 103 passengers survived, four passengers sustained minor injuries during evacuation.
On April 10, 1989, a Southern Company Services Beechcraft Super King Air crashed into an apartment complex 4.1 miles from PNS en route to Atlanta DeKalb-Peachtree Airport. An in-flight cabin fire and smoke disabled the flight crew. All three occupants (2 crew, 1 passenger) died.
On July 6, 1996, Delta Air Lines Flight 1288, an MD-88, experienced an uncontained engine failure during takeoff on runway 17. Fragments from the number one (left) Pratt & Whitney JT8D-219 turbofan engine penetrated the fuselage, killing two and seriously injuring one of the 148 people on board.

Public safety 
Pensacola International is protected by several local and federal law enforcement and public safety agencies. Specifically, they are served by:

 Pensacola Police Department
 Transportation Security Administration
 Aircraft rescue and firefighting (ARFF) is provided by the Pensacola Fire Department, who operate out of one fire station on the premises.

References

External links
 Pensacola International Airport, official site
 Aerial image as of November 1999 from USGS The National Map
 
 

Airports in Florida
Pensacola, Florida
Pensacola metropolitan area
Transportation buildings and structures in Escambia County, Florida
Airports established in 1935
1935 establishments in Florida